Federalist No. 5 is an essay by John Jay, the fifth of The Federalist Papers. It was published on November 10, 1787 under the pseudonym Publius, the name under which all The Federalist papers were published. It is the last of four essays by Jay discussing the protection of the United States from dangerous foreign influence, especially military force. It is titled "The Same Subject Continued: Concerning Dangers from Foreign Force and Influence".

Summary of the argument
Jay argues that the American people can learn from the troubles Great Britain had when it was divided into individual states: envy and jealousy ran rampant. Eventually one American state or confederacy would grow more powerful than the others (assumed by Jay to be the north).  The American entities would grow jealous and distrustful of each other.  The American entities might ally with different foreign nations, tearing America apart. A single nation would be 'joined in affection and free from all apprehension of different interests' and as such a much more formidable nation.

External links 

 Text of The Federalist No. 5: congress.gov

05
Federalist No. 05
1787 essays
1787 in the United States